Philip Rees (born 1941) is a British writer and librarian formerly in charge of acquisitions at the J. B. Morrell Library, University of York. He has written books on fascism and the extreme right.

Works
Fascism in Britain (Harvester Press; Humanities Press, 1979)
Fascism and Pre-fascism in Europe, 1890-1945: A Bibliography of the Extreme Right (Harvester Press; Barnes & Noble, 1984)
Biographical Dictionary of the Extreme Right Since 1890 (Simon & Schuster, 1991)

References

British historical novelists
Historians of fascism
Living people
1941 births
People associated with the University of York
British librarians